Sangram Diliprao Atitkar (born 23 January 1988) is an Indian cricketer who plays for Maharashtra in domestic cricket. He is a right-hand middle-order batsman and right-arm off break bowler.

He plays for Income Tax cricket team in BCCI Corporate Trophy.

References

External links
 

1988 births
Living people
Indian cricketers
Maharashtra cricketers